William Mathieson (born 1870) was a Scottish footballer. His regular position was as a forward. He was born in Glasgow. He played for Clydesdale, Glasgow Thistle, and Manchester United.

External links
MUFCInfo.com profile

1870 births
Scottish footballers
Footballers from Glasgow
Manchester United F.C. players
Year of death missing
Clydesdale F.C. players
Thistle F.C. players
Association football forwards
Football Alliance players
English Football League players